is a Japanese actor who is represented by the talent agency, LDH. He is a member of Gekidan Exile.

Life and career
In 2006, Aoyagi participated in Vocal Battle Audition. He was defeated in the secondary examination and was later invited to try a play, and chose EXPG (Exile Professional Gym) to learn about acting and singing.

In 2009, Aoyagi started his acting debut in the stage play, Attack No.1, and became a member of Gekidan Exile.

Filmography

Television series

Films

Short films

Web Dramas

References

External links

Official profile 
 

1985 births
Living people
People from Sapporo
21st-century Japanese male actors
Japanese male film actors
Japanese male television actors
LDH (company) artists